Šilainiai is a neighborhood in the Lithuanian city of Kaunas, consisting of mostly Soviet built-microdistrict completed in the 1980s. Part of larger Šilainiai  elderate which is one of the largest elderates in the city, consisting of Milikoniai, Sargėnai, Šilainiai, Vytėnai and Romainiai neighborhoods, covering 25 km2 and housing over 55,000 people as of 2021. Eighth and Ninth Forts of the Kaunas Fortress are located in the elderate.

There are several shopping malls, post offices, drug stores, book shops, Šilainiai hospital, Kaunas Holy Spirit Church and Chapel of Saint John Paul II. Near the elderate of Šilainiai, remains of historical estate of Linkuva, Vytėnai and Sargėnai can be found.

Schools
The elderate is home to three gymnasiums (Santaros, Jonas Basanavičius and Juozas Grušas Arts Gymnasium), and three secondary schools (Milikoniai, Tadas Ivanauskas and Ąžuolas Catholic Secondary School).

References

 City of Kaunas - Šilainiai Elderate Website

External links
Website of Kaunas city

Neighbourhoods of Kaunas